Lena Guerrero Aguirre (November 27, 1957 – April 24, 2008) was a Texas political figure who served in the Texas House of Representatives, and was later the first woman and first non-white member of the Texas Railroad Commission, which regulates the oil and natural gas industry. Her political career ended in 1992 over a falsified résumé scandal.

In the 1960s, Guerrero and her siblings were migrant workers. She attended the University of Texas at Austin, where she was president of the Young Democrats of Texas. She was elected to the Texas House, and appointed to a vacant seat on the Texas Railroad Commission, but when she ran for reelection to the seat it was discovered that she had falsely claimed to have graduated from UT.

She died of brain cancer at the age of fifty.

References

External links

1957 births
2008 deaths
Deaths from brain cancer in the United States
Democratic Party members of the Texas House of Representatives
Hispanic and Latino American state legislators in Texas
Hispanic and Latino American women in politics
University of Texas at Austin alumni
People from Austin, Texas
People from Mission, Texas
Members of the Railroad Commission of Texas
American lobbyists
Burials at Texas State Cemetery
Deaths from cancer in Texas
Neurological disease deaths in Texas
Women state legislators in Texas
People who fabricated academic degrees
20th-century American women politicians
20th-century American politicians
21st-century American women